Oswaldo (Spanish for "Oswald") is a Spanish masculine given name.

It may refer to:
Oswaldo Castillo, Nicaraguan-American gardener/construction worker-turned-actor
Oswaldo Cruz (1872–1917), Brazilian physician, bacteriologist, epidemiologist and public health officer
Oswaldo Cruz Filho, Brazilian chess master
Oswaldo de la Cruz, Peruvian politician and a Congressman
Oswaldo de Oliveira (born 1950), Brazilian football manager
Oswaldo de Rivero (born 1936), Peruvian career diplomat
Rubén Oswaldo Díaz (born 1946), former Argentine footballer
Carlos Fernández (footballer, born 1984) (born 1984), Peruvian footballer
Oswaldo Frota-Pessoa (1917–2010), Brazilian physician, biologist and geneticist
Oswaldo Goeldi (1895–1961), Brazilian artist and engraver
Oswaldo Guayasamín (1919–1999), Quechua Indian and Ecuadorian painter and sculptor
Oswaldo Handro (1908–1986), Brazilian botanist, specialist in pteridophytes and spermatophytes
Oswaldo Henríquez (born 1989), Colombian football defender
Oswaldo Ibarra (born 1969), Ecuadorian football player and goalkeeper
Oswaldo López Arellano (1921–2010), President of Honduras, 1963–1971, 1972–1975
Oswaldo Louzada (1912–2008), Brazilian actor
Oswaldo Luizar (born 1962), Peruvian politician
Oswaldo Mairena (born 1975), baseball player
Oswaldo Minda (born 1983), Ecuadorian footballer
Oswaldo Moncayo (1923–1984), Ecuadorian painter
Oswaldo Montenegro (born 1956), Brazilian musician
Oswaldo Navarro (born 1984), Venezuelan baseball player
Oswaldo Payá (born 1952), political activist and dissident in Cuba
Oswaldo Peraza (born 1962), baseball player
Oswaldo Ramírez (born 1947), former Peruvian football striker
Oswaldo Sánchez (born 1973), Mexican international goalkeeper
Oswaldo Viteri (born 1931), neo-figurative artist
Oswaldo Zambrana (born 1981), Bolivian chess master
Oswaldo (footballer)

See also
Osvaldo
Oswaldo Cruz Foundation, scientific institution for research and development in biomedical sciences in Rio de Janeiro, Brazil
Oswaldo Cruz, Rio de Janeiro, neighborhood of the North Zone of Rio de Janeiro
Rodovia Oswaldo Cruz, state highway in the state of São Paulo in Brazil
Oswaldo (TV series)

Spanish masculine given names